Tashu Kaushik is an Indian actress and model. She was earlier seen in films like Raju Maharaju, Dushasana, Vaikuntapali and Graduate. She started career as a stage choreographer. From stage shows, Tashu moved on to films through Ram Gopal Varma's Darwaaza Bandh Rakho.

Early life
Tashu Kaushik was born in Kanpur, Uttar Pradesh, to Rakesh Goud, a businessman. Her family moved to Mumbai in her childhood. She has appeared in many commercials over the years and has acted in a Bollywood film called Zoom.

Career
Tashu Kaushik has completed shooting for Telugabbai opposite Tanish. "My character in the film is a girl who is born and brought up abroad and is a model by profession. It's a glamorous character and you can see me in an all new contemporary look in the movie," says Tashu. The actress is also playing the leading lady opposite Sri of Eerojullo fame in Doola Seenu directed by Raj Kandukoori. She adds that her look in the entertainer will be a stark contrast to her role in Telugabbai. "In this movie, my character is a homely one and I'll be sporting saris mostly," she says. Her third film is Mike Testing 143, where she will be paired opposite Taraka Ratna.

She made her debut in Malayalam films with Rajesh Nair's Annum Innum Ennum. and in Kannada cinema in Cool Ganesha in 2013. She has signed up for her first Tamil film — Pazhaya Vannarapettai. Talking about Pazhaya Vannara Pettai Tashu says, "The movie is important to me because I get to play the role of a traditional girl who is always dressed in half-saris and salwars- a stark contrast to my glam doll stereotype in Tollywood."

She has her eyes set on filmmaking too and want to direct at least one film in the next 10 years. She was running her own restaurant in Versova in Mumbai when her first Telugu film offer came to her.

Filmography

References

External links 
 

Living people
Actresses in Telugu cinema
Actresses in Tamil cinema
Actresses in Malayalam cinema
Female models from Uttar Pradesh
Actresses in Hindi cinema
21st-century Indian actresses
Indian film actresses
Year of birth missing (living people)
People from Kanpur
Actresses from Uttar Pradesh